Arthur Finlay was a Scottish rugby union player.

He also played for Edinburgh Academicals.

He was the brother of James Finlay and Ninian Finlay who were also capped for Scotland, James in the first ever international. They all appeared together once in 1875, in the 0–0 draw against  at Raeburn Place: James winning the last of his four caps, while Arthur and Ninian gained their first caps.

References
 Bath, Richard (ed.) The Scotland Rugby Miscellany (Vision Sports Publishing Ltd, 2007 )

1854 births
1921 deaths
Edinburgh Academicals rugby union players
Edinburgh District (rugby union) players
Scotland international rugby union players
Scottish rugby union players